Silver fern is a species of tree fern.

Silver fern may also refer to:
 NZR RM class (Silver Fern), a class of New Zealand railcars
 Silver fern flag, an alternative flag of New Zealand
 Silver Ferns, the New Zealand national netball team